Schools of Planning and Architecture are educational institutions run by the government of India under the jurisdiction of the Ministry of Human Resource Development. For the specific institutions, see:
 
School of Planning and Architecture, Bhopal 
School of Planning and Architecture, Delhi
School of Planning and Architecture, Vijayawada